Róbert Ruffíni (born 26 January 1967 in Lučenec) is a retired high jumper who represented Czechoslovakia and later Slovakia. His personal best jump is 2.34 metres, achieved in July 1988 in Prague. This is the current Slovak record.

Achievements

References

External links

1967 births
Living people
Slovak male high jumpers
Czech male high jumpers
Athletes (track and field) at the 1988 Summer Olympics
Olympic athletes of Czechoslovakia
People from Lučenec
Sportspeople from the Banská Bystrica Region